Elkins is a city in and the county seat of Randolph County, West Virginia, United States. The community was incorporated in 1890 and named in honor of Stephen Benton Elkins, a U.S. Senator from West Virginia. The population was 6,950 at the 2020 census and estimated at 6,895 in 2021. Elkins is home to Davis and Elkins College and to the Mountain State Forest Festival, held in early October every year.

History

Thomas Skidmore (ca. 1733-1807), born in Maryland, obtained a title to 400 acres of land (“by virtue of a settlement”) in the future Elkins area before 1778. This land, on the east side of the Tygart Valley River, was surveyed by John Poage in 1780 and included the land that is now most of downtown Elkins. Thus, Skidmore was probably the first white settler in what became Elkins.

Before its major development, the area that would become Elkins was known as Leadsville, and was the site of a few scattered homesteads – a place where the local farmers' corn crop was loaded onto boats and floated down the Tygart Valley River. The City of Elkins was developed by U.S. Senators Henry Gassaway Davis (1823–1916) and Stephen Benton Elkins (1841–1911) – and named for the latter – in 1890. (Elkins was Davis' son-in-law.) The two founders developed railroad lines, coal mines, and timbering businesses. Together, they built the West Virginia Central and Pittsburgh Railway into Elkins in 1889, opening a vast territory to industrial development by the late 1890s. After an intense county seat war with nearby Beverly, where the new county courthouse building was burned down in 1897 under suspicious circumstances, Elkins became the county seat in 1899. This was resolved, however, only after multiple referendums, court judgments, and the mobilization of armed bands in both towns. In the end, bloodshed was averted.

In 1904 the new Randolph County Courthouse – designed in the Richardsonian Romanesque style – was completed in Elkins. As the railroad (merged into the Western Maryland Railway in 1905) expanded, Elkins experienced the luxury of passenger train service. In 1930, 18 passenger trains were arriving and leaving Elkins daily. All passenger service was discontinued in 1958.

Where the view of the new town was most delightful and picturesque, Davis and Elkins each built permanent places of residence, known as Graceland (1893) and Halliehurst (1890), respectively.

Today, Elkins has an active economic development authority, chamber of commerce, downtown business organization and numerous social, fraternal and service organizations that sponsor annual events like the Mountain State Forest Festival, which brings thousands of people into the city every year.

Geography
Elkins is located at the confluence of the Tygart Valley River and Leading Creek. Elkins is headquarters for the Monongahela National Forest, a  federal reserve encompassing the "High Alleghenies" area to the east of the city.

In 1995, a second edition of The 100 Best Small Towns in America, written by Norman Crampton, featured Elkins among the special places in the United States.  Crampton quoted then Editor Emerita of The Inter-Mountain, Eldora Marie Bolyard Nuzum, "You can stand on any street in Elkins and turn in all directions and see forest covered mountains rimming the city.  It is unbelievable."

Climate

Record weather events include:

 High temperature:  on July 16, 1988 and on August 6, 1918
 Highest daily minimum:  on July 21, 1930
 Lowest daily maximum:  on December 25, 1983
 Low temperature:  on December 30, 1917
 Highest one-day snowfall: , on December 19, 2009.
 Highest one-day precipitation: , on November 4, 1985.

Demographics

2020 census 
As of the 2020 census, there were 6,934 people and 2,500 households residing in the city. There were 3,499 housing units in Elkins. The racial makeup of the city was 90.5% White, 2.7% African American, 1% Asian, 0.4% Native American, 0.5% from other races, and 4.9% from two or more races. Hispanics or Latinos of any race were 1.7% of the population.

There were 2,500 households, of which  30.8% were married couples living together,  44.4% had a female householder with no spouse present,  18.1% had a male householder with no spouse present.The average household and family size was 3.6. The median age in the city was 38.1 years.

2010 census
As of the census of 2010, there were 7,094 people, 3,038 households, and 1,756 families living in the city. The racial makeup of the city was 96.5% White, 1.2% African American, 0.2% Native American, 0.8% Asian, 0.2% from other races, and 1.2% from two or more races. Hispanic or Latino of any race were 1.1% of the population.

There were 3,038 households, of which 26.0% had children under the age of 18 living with them, 40.6% were married couples living together, 12.5% had a female householder with no husband present, 4.8% had a male householder with no wife present, and 42.2% were non-families. Of all households 35.4% were made up of individuals, and 14.9% had someone living alone who was 65 years of age or older. The average household size was 2.19 and the average family size was 2.80.

The median age in the city was 39.6 years. 20.9% of residents were under the age of 18; 12.2% were between the ages of 18 and 24; 23.2% were from 25 to 44; 26.1% were from 45 to 64; and 17.6% were 65 years of age or older. The gender makeup of the city was 48.0% male and 52.0% female.

2000 census
As of the census of 2000, there were 7,032 people, 2,988 households, and 1,756 families living in the city. The population density was 2,207.7 people per square mile (851.1/km2). There were 3,362 housing units at an average density of 1,055.5 per square mile (406.9/km2). The racial makeup of the city was 96.94% White, 0.90% African American, 0.30% Native American, 0.95% Asian, 0.31% from other races, and 0.60% from two or more races. Hispanic or Latino of any race were 0.77% of the population.

There were 2,988 households, out of which 25.0% had children under the age of 18 living with them, 43.4% were married couples living together, 11.9% had a female householder with no husband present, and 41.2% were non-families. Of all households 35.8% were made up of individuals, and 15.0% had someone living alone who was 65 years of age or older. The average household size was 2.19 and the average family size was 2.83.

In the city the population was spread out, with 21.2% under the age of 18, 11.7% from 18 to 24, 25.4% from 25 to 44, 24.0% from 45 to 64, and 17.7% who were 65 years of age or older. The median age was 39 years. For every 100 females, there were 92.4 males. For every 100 females age 18 and over, there were 86.9 males.

The median income for a household in the city was $26,906, and the median income for a family was $34,291. Males had a median income of $27,012 versus $19,154 for females. The per capita income for the city was $17,916. About 14.4% of families and 19.0% of the population were below the poverty line, including 25.4% of those under age 18 and 9.6% of those age 65 or over.

Events

 Augusta Heritage Festival: a music and heritage festival, with 10+ themes ranging from Old Time, Blue Grass, Cajun, Irish, dance, wood and metal working and more.  Attracting musicians and students from around the world, it is held on the Davis and Elkins College campus and in town over 5 consecutive weeks every summer, typically in July and August.  There is also a week-long Old Time event in October, and a dulcimer week in the spring.

Transportation

Highways
Elkins sits at the junction of US 33, US 219, and US 250.  Heading west of the city, US 33 is Corridor H, a major four-lane highway connecting to Buckhannon and Interstate 79 at Weston.  Long-term plans call for Corridor H to be extended further past its current ending at Kerens eventually to Interstate 81 at Strasburg, Virginia.

Airport

Recreational trails
The western terminus of the Allegheny Highlands Trail is in Elkins.

Notable people

 James E. Allen, Jr., educator
 Randy Armstrong, musician and multi-instrumentalist
 Herman Ball, Football player.
 William Wallace "Wally" Barron, former West Virginia governor, who was later indicted for bribery and jury tampering.
 Henry Gassaway Davis, US senator from West Virginia in 1871–83 and 1904 Democratic candidate for Vice President
 Stephen Benton Elkins, U.S. senator from West Virginia in 1895–1911, Secretary of War and namesake of the town
 Dellos Clinton Gainer, American baseball player
 Marshall Goldberg, NFL All Pro football player
 Clarence "Fuzzy" Haskins, Parliament-Funkadelic bass player
 Eldora Marie Bolyard Nuzum, first female editor of a daily newspaper in West Virginia and interviewer of US Presidents
 John Ochsendorf, MIT Professor and MacArthur Fellow
 Jae Spears, West Virginia state legislator
 Tre Smith, Canadian Football League running back
 Doug Van Gundy, musician and poet

References

Notes

Citations

External links

 City of Elkins official website

 
Cities in West Virginia
Cities in Randolph County, West Virginia
County seats in West Virginia
Davis and Elkins family